Distorsio constricta mcgintyi is a subspecies of medium-sized sea snail, a marine gastropod mollusk in the family Personidae, the Distortio snails.

Description

Distribution
This subspecies occurs in the Gulf of Mexico.

References

 Rosenberg, G.; Moretzsohn, F.; García, E. F. (2009). Gastropoda (Mollusca) of the Gulf of Mexico, Pp. 579–699 in: Felder, D.L. and D.K. Camp (eds.), Gulf of Mexico–Origins, Waters, and Biota. Texas A&M Press, College Station, Texas.

Personidae